Donald John Wilkinson (born 14 February 1955) is a Scottish former first-class cricketer and educator. Wilkinson was born at Irvine in February 1955. 

Education

He was educated at the Lancaster Royal Grammar School and then graduated with a first class degree in history from Keble College, Oxford. While studying at Oxford, he played first-class cricket for Oxford University in 1975 and 1976, making four appearances. Playing as a leg break bowler, he took 7 wickets in his four matches, with best figures of 4 for 89.

Career

After graduating from Oxford, Wilkinson had an extensive career in secondary education. He was appointed headteacher at Cheadle Hulme School (1990-2000) and St Christopher School, Letchworth (2004-06) before taking headmaster appointments overseas. He was also headmaster of Bearwood College prior to its closure in 2014.

References

External links

1955 births
Living people
Sportspeople from Irvine, North Ayrshire
Alumni of Keble College, Oxford
Scottish cricketers
Oxford University cricketers
Scottish schoolteachers